Jeffrey Kwabrna Kyei (born 17 October 1989) is a German former professional footballer who played as a midfielder.

Club career
Kyei played for the California Vulcans, an NCAA Division II team in the United States, between 2012 and 2014. During this time he also played with the Des Moines Menace of the Premier Development League.

Kyei played with the Pittsburgh Riverhounds of the United Soccer League during the 2015 USL season. He made his debut in a 1–1 draw against Saint Louis FC, coming on as a substitute in the 67th minute.

On 27 March 2016, Kyei signed with FC Wichita of the National Premier Soccer League. He scored four goals in 11 appearances.

References

External links 
California Vulcans profile

1989 births
Living people
Sportspeople from Tübingen
German footballers
Footballers from Baden-Württemberg
Association football midfielders
USL Championship players
USL League Two players
Des Moines Menace players
Pittsburgh Riverhounds SC players
SSV Reutlingen 05 players
German expatriate footballers
German expatriate sportspeople in the United States
Expatriate soccer players in the United States